Someș is a river that flows through Romania and Hungary. 

Someș may also refer to:

Someșul Cald, a river in Romania
Someșul Mare, a river in Romania
Someșul Mic, a river in Romania
Someșul Rece, a river in Romania
Ținutul Someș, an alternative name for Ținutul Crișuri, one of the ten former regions of Romania between 1938 and 1940